Swing Easy! is the eighth studio album by Frank Sinatra. It was released in 1954 as a 10" album (Capitol H-528) and consisted of only eight songs, as each side of the record only allowed approximately fourteen minutes of music.

In 2000 it was voted number 368 in Colin Larkin's All Time Top 1000 Albums.

Background
The album was Sinatra's second for Capitol and the first to feature arrangements by Nelson Riddle (Riddle had merely conducted on Songs for Young Lovers). As its title implies, the record concentrates on up-tempo swingers done with a light touch.  Again, the songs were all standards -- "Just One of Those Things," "Wrap Your Troubles in Dreams," "All of Me"—which the singer felt benefited from the new thematic setting, new arrangements, and his increasingly playful and textured vocal style.

In 1955, the eight songs were combined with the eight songs from the 10" album Songs for Young Lovers on a new, 16 song, 12" LP (Capitol W-587) called Swing Easy!, featuring the Swing Easy! cover but including a miniature inset of the Songs for Young Lovers cover. In 1960, the 1954, 8 song, 10" album was re-released as a 12 song, 12" LP (Capitol W-1429) with four additional songs added to expand the running time: "Lean Baby", "I Love You", "How Could You Do A Thing Like That To Me?", and "Why Should I Cry Over You?".

Original album track listing

Side one

"Just One of Those Things" (Cole Porter)
"I'm Gonna Sit Right Down (And Write Myself a Letter)" (Fred E. Ahlert, Joe Young)
"Sunday" (Chester Conn, Benny Krueger, Ned Miller, Jule Styne)
"Wrap Your Troubles in Dreams" (Harry Barris, Ted Koehler, Billy Moll)

Side two

"Taking a Chance on Love" (Vernon Duke, Ted Fetter, John Latouche)
"Jeepers Creepers" (Harry Warren, Johnny Mercer)
"Get Happy" (Ted Koehler, Harold Arlen)
"All of Me" (Gerald Marks, Seymour Simons)

Expanded LP track listing
"Jeepers Creepers" (Harry Warren, Johnny Mercer)
"Taking a Chance on Love" (Vernon Duke, Ted Fetter, John Latouche)
"Wrap Your Troubles in Dreams" (Harry Barris, Ted Koehler, Billy Moll)
"Lean Baby" (Roy Alfred, Billy May)
"I Love You" (Harry Archer, Harlan Thompson)
"I'm Gonna Sit Right Down (And Write Myself a Letter)" (Fred E. Ahlert, Joe Young)
"Get Happy" (Ted Koehler, Harold Arlen)
"All of Me" (Seymour Simons, Gerald Marks)
"How Could You Do a Thing Like That to Me" (Tyree Glenn, Allan Roberts)
"Why Should I Cry Over You?" (Chester Conn, Nathan "Ned" Miller)
"Sunday" (Chester Conn, Benny Krueger, Nathan "Ned" Miller, Jule Styne)
"Just One of Those Things" (Cole Porter)

Certifications

Complete personnel
 Frank Sinatra – vocals
 Nelson Riddle – arranger, conductor

Tracks 1, 2, 3, 4:

Harry Edison (tpt); Tommy Pederson, Ray Sims (tbn): George Roberts (b-tbn); Skeets Herfurt, Mahlon Clark (alt); Babe Russin, Eddie Miller (ten/cit); Joe Koch (bar); Bill Miller (p); Allan Reuss (g); Joe Comfort (b); Alvin Stoller (d); Frank Flynn (vib).

Tracks 5, 6, 7, 8:

Harry Edison (tpt); Tommy Pederson, Ray Sims (tbn); George Roberts (b-tbn): Skeets Herfurt, Abe Most (alt); Babe Russin, Eddie Miller (ten/cit); Joe Koch (bar); Bill Miller (p); Bob Bain (g); Joe Comfort (b); Alvin Stoller (d); Frank Flynn (vib).

References

Frank Sinatra albums
Capitol Records albums
1954 albums
Albums produced by Voyle Gilmore
Albums arranged by Nelson Riddle
Albums conducted by Nelson Riddle
Albums recorded at Capitol Studios